Sant'Angelo a Fasanella is a town and comune in the province of Salerno in the Campania region of south-western Italy.

Geography
The town is located in the north-east of Cilento, close to the mountain range of the Alburni. Its municipal territory is bordered by Bellosguardo, Corleto Monforte, Ottati, Petina and Roscigno.

References

External links

Official website 

Cities and towns in Campania
Localities of Cilento